Charlie Collier (1887-1962) was an Australian former professional rugby league footballer who played in the 1910s. He played for the South Sydney and Western Suburbs  in the New South Wales Rugby League (NSWRL) competition.

Playing career
Collier made his first grade debut for South Sydney in round 5 of the 1911 NSWRL season against Western Suburbs which ended in a 13-8 victory at the Metters Sports Ground. In the same season, Collier was selected to play for Metropolis. In 1912, Collier played in South Sydney's 30-5 City Cup final victory over Glebe scoring a try. In 1914, Collier joined Western Suburbs making eleven appearances.

References

Western Suburbs Magpies players
1887 births
1962 deaths
South Sydney Rabbitohs players
Australian rugby league players
Rugby league wingers